The women's 100 metres event at the 1990 World Junior Championships in Athletics was held in Plovdiv, Bulgaria, at Deveti Septemvri Stadium on 8 and 9 August.

Medalists

Results

Final
9 August
Wind: +0.9 m/s

Semifinals
9 August

Semifinal 1
Wind: -1.3 m/s

Semifinal 2
Wind: +1.1 m/s

Semifinal 3
Wind: +1.0 m/s

Heats
8 August

Heat 1
Wind: -0.1 m/s

Heat 2
Wind: -0.5 m/s

Heat 3
Wind: -0.4 m/s

Heat 4
Wind: -1.3 m/s

Heat 5
Wind: -0.2 m/s

Participation
According to an unofficial count, 37 athletes from 28 countries participated in the event.

References

100 metres
100 metres at the World Athletics U20 Championships